Robert Crost (born 31 December 1924) was a French basketball player. He competed in the men's tournament at the 1952 Summer Olympics.

References

External links
 

1924 births
Possibly living people
French men's basketball players
Olympic basketball players of France
Basketball players at the 1952 Summer Olympics
Place of birth missing